"Adventure" is a song by American singer Eleanor issued as a single in 1988 on Columbia Records. The single rose to number one on the Billboard Dance Club Songs chart.

Overview
Adventure was produced by Eleanor and Shep Pettibone. Also guesting on the song was singer Jim Gilstrap.

The track sampled D Train's 1982 single "You're the One for Me" and Rockers Revenge's bassline riff from "Walking On Sunshine".

Track listings
 7" (US)
A. "Adventure" 4:00
B. "One Dot World" 5:39

 12" (US)
A1. "Adventure" (Extended Mix)  8:00  
A2. "Adventure" (Dub Mix)  7:45  
B1. "Adventure" (Edited Version)  4:00  
B2. "Adventure" (Bonus Beats)  4:44

References

External links
Shep Pettibone remix of "Adventure" at YouTube

1988 songs
1988 singles
American house music songs
Columbia Records singles